Franz Gustav Arndt (20 August 1842, Lobsens - 13 March 1905, Blasewitz) was a German landscape and genre painter.

Biography 
His father, Gustav Wilhelm Arndt was the District Judge. His brother, Wilhelm Arndt, became a noted historian and palaeographer.

He studied at the Grand-Ducal Saxon Art School, Weimar, under Alexander Michelis and Theodor Hagen. In 1876, he became a Professor of landscape painting there and, from 1879 to 1881, he served as Secretary of the Art School. He was also a member of the Weimar "Society for Etchings".

From 1872 to 1877, he made several study trips to Italy. In 1884, he quit his positions at the school and moved to Berlin. Three years later, he moved again, to Blasewitz, near Dresden.

But it means a scene of Liszt's Consolations.

References

Further reading 
 "Arndt, Franz Gustav". In: Friedrich von Boetticher: Malerwerke des 19. Jahrhunderts. Beitrag zur Kunstgeschichte. Vol.1/1, Boetticher's Verlag, Dresden 1891  Online
 "Arndt, Franz Gustav". In: Hermann Alexander Müller, Hans Wolfgang Singer: Allgemeines Künstler-Lexikon. Vol.1, Rütten & Loening, Frankfurt/M. 1921 (Online).
 Walther Scheidig: Die Geschichte der Weimarer Malerschule 1860–1900. Seemann, Leipzig 1991, .

External links

1842 births
1905 deaths
19th-century German painters
German landscape painters
People from Piła County
20th-century German painters